Raymond Charles Haoda (born 15 December 1991) is a Papua New Guinean cricketer.  Haoda is a right-handed batsman who bowls right-arm medium-fast.  He was born in Port Moresby.

Having played age group cricket for Papua New Guinea Under-19s in the 2010 Under-19 World Cup, in which he emerged as the leading wicket taker with 15, he proceeded to be selected as a part of the Papua New Guinea squad for the 2011 World Cricket League Division Three, but did not feature.  His World Cricket League debut for Papua New Guinea came in the 2011 World Cricket League Division Two.  It was in this tournament that he made his List A debut against Namibia.  He played a further 2 List A matches in the competition, both against Hong Kong.  In his 3 matches, he took 6 wickets at a bowling average of 17.66, with best figures of 3/40.

References

External links
Raymond Haoda at ESPNcricinfo
Raymond Haoda at CricketArchive

1991 births
Living people
People from the National Capital District (Papua New Guinea)
Papua New Guinean cricketers